Veridian may refer to:

 Veridian Corporation, an American aerospace and defense company, acquired by General Dynamics in 2003
 Veridian Engineering, Inc., a subsidiary of American aerospace and defense company Veridian Corporation which was acquired by General Dynamics in 2003
 Veridian Credit Union, a credit union in Iowa, United States
 Veridian (software), a digital library platform developed by the people of Greenstone
 Veridian Dynamics, a fictional company in the U.S. television series Better Off Ted
Veridian Events, an event center in Missouri, United States
 "Veridian", a song by Northlane from their 2017 album Mesmer